is a railway station on the Iida Line in the town of Minowa, Kamiina District, Nagano, Japan, operated by Central Japan Railway Company (JR Central).

Lines
Ina-Matsushima Station is served by the Iida Line and is 187.1 kilometers from the starting point of the line at Toyohashi Station.

Station layout
The station consists of two ground-level opposed side platforms connected by a level crossing. The station is staffed.

Platforms

Adjacent stations

History
It was renamed Ina-Matsushima on 16 March 1923. With the privatization of Japanese National Railways (JNR) on 1 April 1987, the station came under the control of JR Central. The current station building was completed in 1991.

Passenger statistics
In fiscal 2016, the station was used by an average of 503 passengers daily (boarding passengers only).

Surrounding area
Tenryū River
Minowa Post Office

See also
 List of railway stations in Japan

References

 Ina-Matsushima Station information 

Railway stations in Nagano Prefecture
Railway stations in Japan opened in 1909
Stations of Central Japan Railway Company
Iida Line
Minowa, Nagano